Prof. Dr Hab. Karol Daniel Kadłubiec (born 22 July 1937 in Karpętna) is a Polish ethnographer, folklorist and historian from the Zaolzie region of the Czech Republic. He specializes also in ethnology, history of language and dialectology, and in a studies of culture, folklore and language of Cieszyn Silesia and Zaolzie.

Kadłubiec graduated from Polish elementary school in Bystrzyca, Polish gymnasium in Czeski Cieszyn in 1955 and then from Slavic philology at the Charles' University in Prague in 1960. He earned a professor degree in 1994.

He works at a Pedagogical Institute at the University of Ostrava from 1964 and later worked at the Charles' University in Prague as a head of department of Polish studies and folkloristic. Kadłubiec is a head of Institute for Studies of Polish Ethnic in the Czech Republic at the University of Ostrava from 1990. He was a co-founder of ethnology department at the Silesian University in Cieszyn and co-founder and head of Folkloristic Section of General Committee of PZKO.

Kadłubiec is also active member of PZKO (Polish Educational and Cultural Union) and from 1965 is a chairman of MK PZKO Mistrzowice.

He is author of several books and of about 600 scientific discourses and articles and long-time contributor to Zwrot magazine.

Works 
 Płyniesz Olzo ...  Vol. 1-2 (1970–1972) (editor)
 Gawędziarz cieszyński (1973) (with Józef Jeżowicz)
 Na cieszyńskiej ziemi: jednodniówka z okazji dwudziestolecia Sekcji Folklorystycznej przy Zarządzie Głównym Polskiego Związku Kulturalno-Oświatowego (1985) (editor)
 Uwarunkowania cieszyńskiej kultury ludowej (1987)
 Ojcowski dom: jednodniówka na dwudziestopięciolecie Sekcji Folklorystycznej Zarządu Głównego Polskiego Związku Kulturalno-Oświatowego (1990) (editor)
 Raz, dwa, trzy, wychodź ty!: twórczość słowna polskich dzieci z Zaolzia (1993) (with Ilona Fryda)
 Cieszyńsko-zaolziańska polszczyzna (1994)
 Górniczy śmiech: komizm ludowy pogranicza czesko-polskiego (1995)
 Kultura ludowa na pograniczu (1995) (editor)
 Nasza ojcowizna : jednodniówka na trzydziestolecie Sekcji Folklorystycznej przy Zarządzie Głównym Polskiego Związku Kulturalno-Oświatowego (1995) (editor, with Jan Szymik)
 Polská národní menšina na Těšínsku v České republice (1920–1995) (1997)
 Cieszyńska ojczyzna polszczyzna (2001) (with Władysław Milerski)
 Skoro zapómniane: o radościach i smutkach starej Karwiny (2002)
 W cieszyńskim mateczniku (2015)
 Płyniesz Olzo: monografia kultury ludowej Śląska Cieszyńskiego (2016)
 Opowiado Anna Chybidziurowa (2017)
 Od Cieszyna do Bogumina (2019)

References 
 
 
 Profile of Karol Daniel Kadłubiec in Zwrot 7/2007: 22.

1937 births
Polish ethnographers
20th-century Czech historians
Polish male non-fiction writers
Polish people from Zaolzie
Polish folklorists
Living people
Charles University alumni
Dialectologists
Writers from Třinec